Matulka is a surname of Czech origin.  People with that name include:

People
 Charlie Matulka, Democratic candidate for the United States Senate election in Nebraska, 2002
  (b.1953), Czech politician
 Jan Matulka (1890–1972), painter
  (1955-1991), victim of the January Events in Lithuania

Places
 , watercourse in British Columbia
 , dam in Phillips County, Montana

Surnames of Czech origin
Surnames
Czech-language surnames